Ottawa station was a Chicago, Rock Island and Pacific Railroad station in Ottawa, Illinois. It was located just east of Columbus Street and on the south side of the track. The building had the same design as Rock Island Line stations in Iowa City and Council Bluffs, Iowa. The station is east of a junction with the Illinois Railway (former CB&Q branch line to Streator). The still standing station house is used for CSX maintenance of way vehicles.

References

External links

Railway stations in LaSalle County, Illinois
Former railway stations in Illinois
Historic American Engineering Record in Illinois
Ottawa, Illinois
Former Chicago, Rock Island and Pacific Railroad stations